Anar Jar (also Romanized as Anār Jār) is a village in Natel Kenar-e Olya Rural District, in the Central District of Nur County, Mazandaran Province, Iran. At the 2006 census, its population was 262, in 62 families.

References 

Populated places in Nur County